Seven motor vessels of Stena Line have carried the name Stena Nordica.

  
  
 MV Stena Nordica (1973) 
 
  
 MV Stena Nordica (1979) 
 

Ship names